The Uganda Wildlife Authority (UWA) is a semi-autonomous Ugandan government agency that aims to conserve, manage and regulate Uganda’s wildlife. "UWA is mandated to ensure sustainable management of wildlife resources and supervise wildlife activities in Uganda, both within and outside the protected areas". As of April 2020, UWA manages ten national parks, twelve wildlife reserves, and fourteen wildlife sanctuaries. UWA also provides guidance for five community wildlife areas. It is governed by a board of trustees appointed by the Minister of Tourism, Wildlife and Antiquities, currently Tom Butime.

Location
The headquarters of UWA are located at Plot. 7, Kira Road, in the neighborhood called Kamwookya, in the Central Division of the city of Kampala, Uganda's capital. The UWA headquarters building is sandwiched between the Uganda Museum to the west and the British High Commission to the east, along Kira Road. The geographical coordinates of this location are:0°20'10.0"N, 32°35'01.0"E (Latitude:0.336111, Longitude:32.583611).

Governance

Board of Trustees
The agency is governed by a nine-person board of trustees, appointed by the Minister of Tourism, Wildlife and Antiquities. The current board, which was appointed in March 2018, is chaired by Benjamin Otto, a former Permanent Secretary in the Ministry of Tourism. The board serves for three years. The table below lists all the board members.

Management
On 26 March 2018, Sam Mwandha, who was previously employed at UWA in the early 2010s, officially assumed the office of executive director of Uganda Wildlife Authority, succeeding Dr. Andrew Seguya, who had served two consecutive three-year terms in that office.

History
The UWA was established in August 1996 by the Uganda Wildlife Statute, which merged the Uganda National Parks Department with the Uganda Game and Fisheries Department. In 2000, the Statute became an Act of parliament. The Act was amended in 2019 into the Uganda Wildlife Act, 2019.

References

External links
 Official Website

Nature conservation in Uganda
Organizations established in 1996
1996 establishments in Uganda
National park administrators
Organisations based in Kampala
Kampala Central Division
Government agencies established in 1996